Sergey Lopatin may refer to
Sergey Lopatin (weightlifter, born 1939), Russian weightlifter
Sergey Lopatin (weightlifter, born 1961), Russian weightlifter